Tyrad Pictures was a film production company in the United States during the silent film era. It was headquartered in New York City.

Filmography
 Your Wife and Mine (1919)
 Man and Woman (1919)
 Human Passions (1919)
 It Happened in Paris (1919 film),
 The Red Viper (1919)
 Broken Hearts (1920)

References

External links
 IMDb entry

Film production companies of the United States
Entertainment companies based in New York City